The 1955–56 season was Port Vale's 44th season of football in the English Football League, and their second successive season (thirty-first overall) in the Second Division. Gaining ten points on their previous season's total, the club progressed well, achieving their best finish since 1933–34. Finishing one place above rivals Stoke City, it was the first time they outperformed Stoke since 1930–31. Part of the promotion-chasing pack at the season's end, they tailed off with four points from six games as Leeds United finished strongly to end up second. Vale's season was built on the defensive strength of the legendary 1953–54 season, along with record-signing England international Eddie Baily.

Overview

Second Division
The pre-season saw Stan Turner and Ken Griffiths undergo operations, keeping them out of action for the start of the campaign.

The season began with just one loss in the opening eleven games, including victories at Upton Park and Craven Cottage, and a 1–0 home win over rivals Stoke City in front of a crowd of 37,261. Nevertheless, injuries began to affect the first eleven, leaving room for reserves like Derek Mountford, Stan Smith, and Tom Conway to make an impression. The 'Steele Curtain' defence was still in operation, picking up five clean sheets in these eleven games. Journalist Bernard Jones compared 'the Vale Plan' to the Brazilian method of defence, defending the penalty area at all costs as that was from where 95% of all goals were scored. However manager Freddie Steele responded by claiming there was no such plan, and that the main objective was simply 'to beat the opposition'. On 22 October, Sheffield Wednesday went away from Vale Park with a 1–0 win, this was followed with a 4–1 defeat at Filbert Street. Steele began to initiate a modern pre-match ritual of having the players warm up in their tracksuits fifteen minutes before kick-off, though on 12 November this did them no favours at Ewood Park, as Blackburn Rovers romped to a 7–1 victory. Steele made eight changes following the defeat, which made little difference as Vale extended their run without a win to nine games. This left them in fifteenth place by mid-December, with a host of players out with injuries.

Cyril Done's return to match fitness was marked with a 2–1 win at the Memorial Stadium, beginning a sequence of one defeat in ten games. This left them in seventh place by February, in with a shot of promotion. In January, Eddie Baily was signed from Tottenham Hotspur for a club-record £7,000. Signing an inside-forward who was part of England's 1950 FIFA World Cup squad was a sign of the club's ambitions for top-flight football. Outclassed by Wednesday on 3 March, they lost 4–0 at Hillsborough, but followed this with wins over Blackburn Rovers and Bristol City. On 31 March they came to a 'hard-fought' 1–1 draw at Stoke's Victoria Ground, which left the "Valiants" in fifth place, level on points with second-placed Liverpool. In with a great chance of promotion by April, defeats at home to Nottingham Forest and Leicester City, and a 4–1 beating at Anfield ruined their chances. Harry Poole made his debut on the last day of the season, as Vale recorded a 3–2 win over Middlesbrough.

They finished in twelfth position with 45 points, one point and one position above rivals Stoke. The Steele Curtain boasted the best defensive record in the division, though only the bottom five scored fewer goals.

Finances
On the financial side, a loss was made of £4,974, blamed upon a 'crippling burden' of £12,422 in entertainment tax. Home attendances were down by around 2,000 a game to 18,985, leaving gate receipts at £60,784. Steele retained thirty professionals, releasing Albert Mullard and Ray Hancock (Northwich Victoria), and Tom Conway (Leek Town).

Cup competitions
In the FA Cup, Vale narrowly defeated Third Division South Walsall 1–0 at Fellows Park to win a Fourth Round tie with First Division Everton. A crowd of 44,278 saw 'a match that had everything', as the "Toffees" escaped with a 3–2 victory, Vale having had two goals disallowed.

League table

Results
Port Vale's score comes first

Football League Second Division

Results by matchday

Matches

FA Cup

Player statistics

Appearances

Top scorers

Transfers

Transfers in

Transfers out

References

Sources

Port Vale F.C. seasons
Port Vale